George M. Green (1884 – death date unknown) was an American Negro league outfielder between 1919 and 1920.

A native of Maryland, Green played for the Brooklyn Royal Giants in 1919 and 1920. In 13 recorded games, he posted eight hits and two RBI in 49 plate appearances.

References

External links
Baseball statistics and player information from Baseball-Reference Black Baseball Stats and Seamheads

1884 births
Date of birth missing
Year of death missing
Place of birth missing
Place of death missing
Brooklyn Royal Giants players
Baseball players from Maryland
Baseball outfielders